This is a list of public-representative office-holders in Ireland. It includes both the Republic of Ireland and Northern Ireland, as well as offices within the Lordship of Ireland (1171–1542), the Kingdom of Ireland (1542–1800) and for Ireland within the United Kingdom of Great Britain and Ireland (1801–1922).

Republic of Ireland

President
Presidents of Ireland

Taoiseach
Taoiseach

Tánaiste
Tánaiste

Government ministries
Minister for Agriculture, Food and the Marine
Minister for Children, Equality, Disability, Integration and Youth
Minister for Defence
Minister for Education
Minister for Enterprise, Trade and Employment
Minister for the Environment, Climate and Communications
Minister for Finance
Minister for Foreign Affairs
Minister for Health
Minister for Housing, Local Government and Heritage
Minister for Justice
Minister for Public Expenditure, National Development Plan Delivery and Reform
Minister for Social Protection
Minister for Tourism, Culture, Arts, Gaeltacht, Sport and Media
Minister for Transport
List of women cabinet ministers of the Republic of Ireland

Defunct Government ministries
Minister for the Co-ordination of Defensive Measures
Minister for Economic Affairs
Minister for Fine Arts
Minister for Industries
Minister for Labour
Minister for Posts and Telegraphs
Minister for Publicity
Minister for Supplies

Ministers of State
Minister of State at the Department of Agriculture, Food and the Marine
Minister of State at the Department of Children, Equality, Disability, Integration and Youth
Minister of State at the Department of Defence
Minister of State at the Department of Education
Minister of State at the Department of Enterprise, Trade and Employment
Minister of State at the Department of the Environment, Climate and Communications
Minister of State at the Department of Finance
Minister of State at the Department of Foreign Affairs
Minister of State at the Department of Further and Higher Education, Research, Innovation and Science
Minister of State at the Department of Health
Minister of State at the Department of Housing, Local Government and Heritage
Minister of State at the Department of Justice
Minister of State at the Department of Public Expenditure, National Development Plan Delivery and Reform
Minister of State at the Department of Rural and Community Development
Minister of State at the Department of Social Protection
Minister of State at the Department of the Taoiseach
Minister of State at the Department of Tourism, Culture, Arts, Gaeltacht, Sport and Media
Minister of State at the Department of Transport
Minister of State for Disability
Minister of State for European Affairs
List of women ministers of state of the Republic of Ireland

Former Positions
Minister of State for Children
Minister of State to the Government
Minister of State at the Department of Labour
Minister of State at the Department of Posts and Telegraphs

Dáil Éireann
Ceann Comhairle
List of women in Dáil Éireann
Members of the 1st Dáil
Members of the 2nd Dáil
Members of the 3rd Dáil
Members of the 4th Dáil
Members of the 5th Dáil
Members of the 6th Dáil
Members of the 7th Dáil
Members of the 8th Dáil
Members of the 9th Dáil
Members of the 10th Dáil
Members of the 11th Dáil
Members of the 12th Dáil
Members of the 13th Dáil
Members of the 14th Dáil
Members of the 15th Dáil
Members of the 16th Dáil
Members of the 17th Dáil
Members of the 18th Dáil
Members of the 19th Dáil
Members of the 20th Dáil
Members of the 21st Dáil
Members of the 22nd Dáil
Members of the 23rd Dáil
Members of the 24th Dáil
Members of the 25th Dáil
Members of the 26th Dáil
Members of the 27th Dáil
Members of the 28th Dáil
Members of the 29th Dáil
Members of the 30th Dáil
Members of the 31st Dáil
Members of the 32nd Dáil
Members of the 33rd Dáil

Seanad Éireann
Cathaoirleach
Leader of the Seanad
List of women in Seanad Éireann
Members of the 1922 Seanad
Members of the 1925 Seanad
Members of the 1928 Seanad
Members of the 1931 Seanad
Members of the 1934 Seanad
Members of the 2nd Seanad
Members of the 3rd Seanad
Members of the 4th Seanad
Members of the 5th Seanad
Members of the 6th Seanad
Members of the 7th Seanad
Members of the 8th Seanad
Members of the 9th Seanad
Members of the 10th Seanad
Members of the 11th Seanad
Members of the 12th Seanad
Members of the 13th Seanad
Members of the 14th Seanad
Members of the 15th Seanad
Members of the 16th Seanad
Members of the 17th Seanad
Members of the 18th Seanad
Members of the 19th Seanad
Members of the 20th Seanad
Members of the 21st Seanad
Members of the 22nd Seanad
Members of the 23rd Seanad
Members of the 24th Seanad
Members of the 25th Seanad
Members of the 26th Seanad

MEPs
List of members of the European Parliament for Ireland, 1973
List of members of the European Parliament for Ireland, 1973–1977
List of members of the European Parliament for Ireland, 1977–1979
List of members of the European Parliament for Ireland, 1979–1984
List of members of the European Parliament for Ireland, 1984–1989
List of members of the European Parliament for Ireland, 1989–1994
List of members of the European Parliament for Ireland, 1994–1999
List of members of the European Parliament for Ireland, 1999–2004
List of members of the European Parliament for Ireland, 2004–2009
List of members of the European Parliament for Ireland, 2009–2014
List of members of the European Parliament for Ireland, 2014–2019
List of members of the European Parliament for Ireland, 2019–2024
List of women members of the European Parliament for Ireland

Mayors
List of mayors of Cork
List of mayors of Dublin
List of mayors of Galway
List of rulers and officers of Galway 1230–1485
List of mayors of Limerick

Other offices
Leader of the Opposition
List of Irish European Commissioners
List of presidential appointees to the Council of State

Defunct offices
Members of the Senate of Southern Ireland
Governors-General of the Irish Free State

Northern Ireland

First/deputy Minister
First Minister and deputy First Minister

MLAs
Members of the Northern Ireland Assembly elected in 1998
Members of the Northern Ireland Assembly elected in 2003
Members of the Northern Ireland Assembly elected in 2007
Members of the Northern Ireland Assembly elected in 2011
Members of the Northern Ireland Assembly elected in 2016
Members of the Northern Ireland Assembly elected in 2017

Mayors
List of mayors of Belfast
Mayor of Derry

Defunct offices

Prime Minister
Prime Minister of Northern Ireland

MPAs
Members of the Northern Ireland Assembly elected in 1973
Members of the Northern Ireland Constitutional Convention (1975)
Members of the Northern Ireland Assembly elected in 1982
Members of the Northern Ireland Forum (1996)

MPs (Parliament of Northern Ireland)
List of members of the 1st House of Commons of Northern Ireland
List of members of the 2nd House of Commons of Northern Ireland
List of members of the 3rd House of Commons of Northern Ireland
List of members of the 4th House of Commons of Northern Ireland
List of members of the 5th House of Commons of Northern Ireland
List of members of the 6th House of Commons of Northern Ireland
List of members of the 7th House of Commons of Northern Ireland
List of members of the 8th House of Commons of Northern Ireland
List of members of the 9th House of Commons of Northern Ireland
List of members of the 10th House of Commons of Northern Ireland
List of members of the 11th House of Commons of Northern Ireland
List of members of the 12th House of Commons of Northern Ireland
List of women members of the House of Commons of Northern Ireland

MEPs
Northern Ireland MEPs

Others
List of Nationalist Party MPs

Ireland (pre-1922)
Earl Marshal of Ireland
Chief Secretary for Ireland
Under-Secretary for Ireland
List of Lords Lieutenant of County Dublin
List of Lords Lieutenant of Dublin
List of chief governors of Ireland
List of Irish representative peers
Lord Chancellor of Ireland
Lord High Steward of Ireland
Lord High Treasurer of Ireland

See also
Families in the Oireachtas
Records of Irish heads of government since 1922
Records of members of the Oireachtas

References

 
 List
Politicians